Norman Gordon Farquharson (18 July 1907 – 11 August 1992) was a male tennis player from South Africa.

In 1931 Farquharson and his compatriot partner Vernon Kirby were runners-up in the doubles final of the French Championships, losing in straight sets to the American pair George Lott and John Van Ryn. In 1937 they again reached the doubles final in which they lost to the German pair Gottfried von Cramm and Henner Henkel in four sets.
 
Farquharson won the singles title of the South African Championships on four occasions (1934, 1935, 1936, 1938).

Between 1929 and 1937 he played in twelve ties for the South African Davis Cup team. The best team result during that period was reaching the semifinal of the European Zone in 1935 against Czechoslovakia. Farquharson had a Davis Cup match record of 13 wins vs. 10 losses and was more successful in doubles (9/3) than singles (4/7).

Grand Slam finals

Doubles (2 runners-up)

Mixed doubles (1 runner-up)

References

External links
 
 
 

1907 births
1992 deaths
South African male tennis players
Tennis players from Johannesburg
White South African people